Prince Inigo of Urach, Count of Württemberg, (German: Eberhard Friedrich Inigo Fürst von Urach; Lithuanian: Princas Eberhardas Frydrichas Inigo fon Urachas; born April 12, 1962) is a member of the House of Urach in Lithuania, son of Prince Eberhard of Urach and Princess Iniga of Thurn and Taxis, the current fifth self-appointed pretender to the failed pro-German Lithuanian throne. He is the grandson in the male line of King-elect of Lithuania, Wilhelm Karl of Urach, known by his regnal name as Mindaugas II, and is a descendant of Duchess Liudvika Karolina Radvilaitė of the Radvila family from Biržai.

Life, family and education 
Prince Inigo was born in Bachhausen, Munich,  Bavaria, West Germany, on April 12, 1962, as the fifth and youngest child of Prince Eberhard of Urach and Princess Iniga of Thurn and Taxis. Inigo's father died when he was only seven. In September 1991, he married his wife, Baroness Danielle von und zu Bodman at Niederaichbach, Germany, with whom he currently has 3 children together — Eberhard, Anselm, and Amelie. Inigo is a forester by profession and served in the Bundeswehr armed forces while his wife studied biogenetics. He is connected to the Liechtenstein, Luxembourgish, British, Russian, Monagasque, Bavarian and Portuguese royal families by birth.

In 2009, at the age of 47, he made his first visit to Lithuania. From this year onwards, his visits to Lithuania are being organized regularly. Prince Inigo's first official visit to Lithuania, however, happened on November 17–21, 2012. Lithuanian monarchist movements consider Prince Inigo to be the rightful pretender to the now-abolished Lithuanian throne as the marriages of his older brothers are morganatic. “If Lithuanians will ever want to revive the monarchy, if they will need my knowledge and experience, I am ready to accept this honour the same way my grandfather did. However, this decision will be not up to me, but to the Lithuanian people,” Prince Inigo once said in an interview for the Lithuanian press.

He speaks German, English and is known to be learning Lithuanian.

Political views

Nuclear energy 
Inigo is an outspoken critic of nuclear energy, deeming it to be costly and unpromising in the long run and urging to focus on sustainable energy instead. “I think that nuclear energy is a cul-de-sac. Uranium, like oil are finite and limited resources,” Prince has said in an interview. “And also all the pollution related to the fuel, production, use and later destruction. The best solution is green-energies. Let us recall the Gospel of Matthew: Is it human that your child asks for bread, and you give him a stone? And what we do, we leave all these problems to our children and grandchildren,” he added. Inigo has reacted positively to the shutdown of Ignalina Nuclear Power Plant in Lithuania, by saying that the nuclear waste it produced was raying, poisonous, and “angerous for fifty thousand years”.

Ancestry

References 

 

German Roman Catholics
House of Urach
Lithuanian monarchy
Princes of Urach
Lithuanian people of German descent
Dukes of Urach
1962 births
Living people